Cameron Lake may refer to one of the following lakes:
Canada
Cameron Lake (Alberta), an international lake
Cameron Lake (British Columbia)
Cameron Lake (Ontario)
New Zealand
Lake Cameron (Waikato) / Lake Kareaotahi
Lake Cameron statistical area
Antarctica
Lake Cameron (Antarctica)
United States
Cameron Lake (Polk County, Minnesota)